The 1805 Land Lottery was the first lottery of the Georgia Land Lotteries, a lottery system used by the U.S. state of Georgia between the years 1805 and 1833 to steal and redistribute Cherokee and Muscogee land.  The lottery was authorized by the Georgia General Assembly by an act of May 11, 1803, with drawings occurring in 1805. The lottery redistributed land in Baldwin, Wayne, and Wilkinson counties. 490-acre plots were redistributed in Wayne County and 202.5-acre plots were redistributed in Baldwin and Wilkinson counties. The 1805 lottery were used to steal Muscogee land and redistribute it to white settlers.

The John Rountree Log House in Twin City, Georgia, was built by John Rountree on land he won in the lottery.

See also
Georgia Land Lotteries
1807 Land Lottery
1820 Land Lottery
1821 Land Lottery
1827 Land Lottery
1832 Land Lottery
Gold Lottery of 1832
1833 Fractions Lottery
Georgia resolutions 1827
Indian removal

References

External links
Georgia Land Lottery Records Research Guide, Random Acts of Genealogical Kindness

1805 in Georgia (U.S. state)
Georgia Land Lotteries
Government of Georgia (U.S. state)
History of Georgia (U.S. state)
Muscogee
Lotteries in the United States